Candidula cavannae is a species of air-breathing land snail, a terrestrial pulmonate gastropod mollusk in the family Geomitridae, the hairy snails and their allies.

References

cavannae
Gastropods described in 1881